Cédric Ricardo Alves Soares  (born 31 August 1991), known simply as Cédric, is a Portuguese professional footballer who plays as a right back for  club Fulham, on loan from Arsenal, and the Portugal national team.

Cédric's career started with Sporting CP, going on to appear in 93 competitive games over the course of four Primeira Liga seasons and scoring two goals. He signed for Southampton in 2015.

Having earned 72 caps across all youth levels, Cédric made his senior debut for Portugal in 2014. He appeared for the country at the 2018 World Cup and Euro 2016, winning the latter tournament.

Club career

Sporting
Born in Singen, Baden-Württemberg, Germany to Portuguese parents, Cédric returned to Portugal at the age of two. He joined Sporting CP's youth system in 1998, aged seven.

Cédric made his Primeira Liga debut with the first team on 8 May 2011, starting in a 0–1 home loss against Vitória de Setúbal. For 2011–12 he, alongside teammate Adrien Silva, was loaned to fellow top division club Académica, where he played regularly and won that season's Taça de Portugal, playing the full 90 minutes in the 1–0 triumph against Sporting.

Subsequently, Cédric returned to the Lisbon side, being first-choice in the following years under several managers. He scored his first goal in the Portuguese top division on 15 December 2012, netting with his left foot from 30 metres in a 1–1 draw away to Nacional.

In the domestic cup final on 31 May 2015, against Braga, Cédric was sent off in the 14th minute after conceding a penalty with a foul on Djavan, but Sporting eventually won in a shoot-out.

Southampton
On 18 June 2015, Cédric was announced as the second summer signing for Southampton on a four-year contract, with the English club paying up to €6.5 million (£4.7 million) for his services. He made his debut on 30 July, playing the full 90 minutes in a 3–0 home win over Vitesse for the third qualifying round of the UEFA Europa League. Ten days later, he first appeared in the Premier League, assisting the opening goal for Graziano Pellè in a 2–2 draw away to Newcastle United before being substituted for Cuco Martina at half-time.

Cédric scored his first goal for Southampton on 18 March 2018, in a 2–0 victory away to Wigan Athletic in the sixth round of the FA Cup, the first match under new manager Mark Hughes.

Inter Milan (loan)
On 26 January 2019, Cédric moved to Inter Milan on loan for the rest of the season, with an option to purchase for £9.5m in the summer. He made his first appearance five days later, playing 15 minutes and converting his attempt in the 4–3 shoot-out loss against Lazio in the quarter-finals of the Coppa Italia (1–1 after 120 minutes).

Arsenal
Cédric joined fellow Premier League team Arsenal on a six-month loan on 31 January 2020.

On 24 June, it was announced that Cédric had sealed a permanent move to Arsenal on a long-term deal, as a free transfer upon the expiry of his contract.

The Premier League resumed in June, having been suspended for three months due to the COVID-19 pandemic in the United Kingdom.
Cédric made his Arsenal debut on 1 July, coming on as a 77th-minute substitute and scoring a 20-yard strike with his left foot, four minutes after coming on, in a 4–0 victory over Norwich City. After playing for Southampton as a substitute in their FA Cup third-round tie against Huddersfield Town, Cédric was cup-tied and thus unable to take part in Arsenal's victorious 2019–20 FA Cup campaign.

On 29 August, Cédric came on as a substitute, scoring Arsenal's third penalty in their shoot-out win against Liverpool in the Community Shield after the game ended 1–1. On 18 January 2021, Cédric made his first Premier League start of the season in a 3–0 win over Newcastle United. He had a run in the team at left-back while Kieran Tierney was out injured.

Cédric scored his second goal for Arsenal on the final day of the 2021–22 Premier League season, finishing off a Bukayo Saka corner for Arsenal’s third goal in an eventual 5–1 win over Everton at Emirates Stadium.

Fulham (loan) 
On 31 January 2023, Cédric joined fellow Premier League team Fulham on loan for the remainder of the season.

International career
Cédric was part of the Portuguese under-20 team called up for the 2011 FIFA U-20 World Cup in Colombia, eventually finishing the tournament in second place.

He played ten times with the Portuguese under-21s, his debut occurring on 1 September 2011 in a 2–0 win in Moldova for the 2013 UEFA European Championship qualifiers. His maiden appearance with the senior team was on 11 October 2014, as he started in a 1–2 friendly defeat to France in Paris.

Cédric was selected by manager Fernando Santos for his UEFA Euro 2016 squad. His first game in the tournament took place on 25 June, when he started alongside Southampton teammate José Fonte in the round-of-16 clash against Croatia (1–0 win after extra time). He went on to retain his position until the final, won at the expense of hosts France.

He scored his first goal for his country on 17 June 2017, netting in the 86th minute of an eventual 2–2 group stage draw to Mexico at the 2017 FIFA Confederations Cup at the Kazan Arena in Russia. In May 2018, he was named in Portugal's squad for the 2018 FIFA World Cup.

In March 2021, Cédric was recalled to the national team for the first time since 2019, for the World Cup qualifying games. On 27 March, he started and provided an assist in a 2–2 draw against Serbia; this was his first game for Portugal since October 2018.

In October 2022, he was named in Portugal's preliminary 55-man squad for the 2022 FIFA World Cup in Qatar.

Media
Cédric was involved in the Amazon Original sports docuseries All or Nothing: Arsenal, which documented the club by spending time with the coaching staff and players behind the scenes both on and off the field throughout their 2021–22 season.

Career statistics

Club

International

Honours

Club
Académica
Taça de Portugal: 2011–12

Sporting
Taça de Portugal: 2014–15

Southampton
EFL Cup runner-up: 2016–17

Arsenal
FA Community Shield: 2020

International
Portugal U20
FIFA U-20 World Cup runner-up: 2011

Portugal
UEFA European Championship: 2016

Orders
 Knight of the Order of Prince Henry
 Commander of the Order of Merit

References

External links

Profile at the Arsenal F.C. website
Profile at the Premier League website

National team data 

1991 births
Living people
People from Singen
Sportspeople from Freiburg (region)
German people of Portuguese descent
Citizens of Portugal through descent
Portuguese people of German descent
Portuguese footballers
Footballers from Baden-Württemberg
Association football defenders
Primeira Liga players
Liga Portugal 2 players
Sporting CP footballers
Associação Académica de Coimbra – O.A.F. players
Sporting CP B players
Premier League players
Southampton F.C. players
Arsenal F.C. players
Fulham F.C. players
Serie A players
Inter Milan players
Portugal youth international footballers
Portugal under-21 international footballers
Portugal international footballers
UEFA Euro 2016 players
2017 FIFA Confederations Cup players
2018 FIFA World Cup players
UEFA European Championship-winning players
Portuguese expatriate footballers
Expatriate footballers in England
Expatriate footballers in Italy
Portuguese expatriate sportspeople in England
Portuguese expatriate sportspeople in Italy
Commanders of the Order of Merit (Portugal)